Live is the fourth album and the first Live album by the German Jazz rock band Kraan. The album was recorded in the "Quartier Latin" in Berlin in October 1974.

Track listing

Side one
 "Jerk of life" – 4:57
 "Nam nam" – 15:10

Side two
 "Holiday am Marterhorn including Gipfelsturm" – 13:00
 "Sarah's Ritt durch den Schwarzwald"– 6:00

Síde three
 "Andy Nogger" – 3:45
 "Andy Nogger - gutter king" – 6:44
 "Hallo Ja Ja, I don't know" – 10:20

Side four
 "Lonesome liftboy" – 5:15
 "Kraan arabia" – 12:30

Personnel
 Peter Wolbrandt - guitar, vocals
 Jan Fride - drums, percussion
 Hellmut Hattler - bass, vocals
 Johannes Pappert - saxophone

References

Live
1975 live albums
Intercord albums